Zhang Qinsheng (born May 1948) is a retired general (shangjiang) of the Chinese People's Liberation Army, best known for his term as the First Deputy Chief of the PLA General Staff.

Biography
Zhang was born in Xiaoyi, Shanxi. His posts included vice director of military training department of PLA General Staff Department (GSD), director of teaching & research office of campaign of PLA National Defense University (NDU), provost of NDU, and director of the battle department of the GSD. In December 2004, he was elevated to assistant to the chief of the GSD, and was promoted to deputy chief in December 2006. In 2007, he was appointed as commander of the Guangzhou Military Region. In December 2009, he was appointed as the First Deputy Chief of the General Staff, succeeding Ge Zhenfeng. Xu Fenlin succeeded him as commander of the Guangzhou MR.

He attained the rank of lieutenant general in July 2006, and the rank of general in July 2010. It was said that in the lead up to the 18th Party Congress in the autumn of 2012, Zhang was vying for a seat on the Central Military Commission, but was not successful. In response to what he saw as a snub for promotion onto the top military ruling council, Zhang vented his anger at a banquet for senior military officials, apparently prompting President Hu Jintao to walk out in protest. He retired from his active posts in 2013, and was given a position as deputy chair of the National People's Congress Financial and Economic Affairs Committee, which effectively ended his military career.

Zhang was a member of 17th Central Committee of the Communist Party of China.

References

Living people
1948 births
People's Liberation Army generals from Shanxi
Politicians from Lüliang
Chinese Communist Party politicians from Shanxi
People's Republic of China politicians from Shanxi
Commanders of the Guangzhou Military Region